Dolbina luzonensis is a species of moth of the  family Sphingidae. It is known from the Philippines.

References

Dolbina
Moths described in 2009